Sree Angan massacre refers to the massacre of 8 Bengali Hindu sanyasis of Sree Angan monastery by the occupying Pakistani army in Faridpur, East Pakistan on 21 April 1971. Eight sanyasis were killed by the Pakistan Army in the massacre.

Background 

Sree Angan is a Hindu ashram of the Mahanam Sampradaya order of Vaishnavism, in the Goalchamat locality of Faridpur town.

Killings 
On 21 April, the Pakistan army landed in Faridpur. From Dhaka they crossed the Padma at Goalundo Ghat and proceeded towards Faridpur. Around evening as they were entering Faridpur they were passing through Goalchamat. At this point, their Bihari collaborator stopped them by the Sree Angan ashram. The Pakistan Army surrounded the ashram and with the help of Bihari collaborators entered the compound. At the news of their arrival, some of the resident sanyasis fled the ashram. But nine sanyasis did not leave the ashram. At that time the sanyasis were doing kirtan in the prayer hall of the ashram. The kirtan had chants of "Jaya Jagadabandhu Hari! Jaya Jaya Jagadabandhu Har!!". It is said that the Pakistani soldiers misheard the chants as "Jai Bangabandhu" and the Bihari collaborators too convinced them that the sanyasis were praying for victory to Sheikh Mujibur Rahman.

The Pakistani soldiers entered the prayer hall and pulled the sanyasis to the open space in front of the temple, beneath the elephant apple tree in the ashram premises. One sanyasi, Nabakumar Brahmachari escaped and locked himself up in the room beneath the staircase. The remaining eight were made to stand in a line in front the Pakistani soldiers who had already taken position. According to eyewitness accounts, twelve shots were fired one by one. The sanyasis chanted "Jaya Jagadabandhu Hari" as they dropped dead.

The soldiers and the Bihari collaborators looted valuables and cash from the ashram. On the next morning, the corpses were taken away by a Faridpur Municipality truck. 5 days later, the Pakistan army destroyed the spire of the temple using dynamite.

Aftermath 
The brutal killings on the very first day of Pakistani operations created panic among the Hindu citizens. Many of them left the town for countryside. Two surviving sanyasis Amar Bandhu and Haripriya Brahmachari recovered the holy relic of Prabhu Jagadabandhu and carried them in a casket to India.

According to Rabindranath Trivedi, Captain Jamshed, who commanded the massacre and the subsequent desecration and destruction of the ashram, committed suicide in front of the altar of Lord Jagadabandhu Sundar a few days before the surrender of Pakistani Armed Forces on 16 December 1971. He was reportedly buried within the Sree Angan compound, near the pond of the Shiva temple by the collaborators. According to freedom fighter Prabodh Kumar Sarkar, Captain Jamshed had become a lunatic before his death. The sanyasis returned to the ashram after the liberation of Bangladesh. They restored the holy relic and rebuilt the damaged temple. New sanyasis were gradually initiated in the order.

Memorial 
In 1996, a memorial was erected in the compound of Sree Angan by the ashram authority. Eight black plaques were created for the eight deceased sanyasis. The plaques have the shape of truncated pyramid with a square base measuring 40 square centimeters and 95 centimeters in height.

A memorial has also been erected in Sree Sree Mahanam Angan, Kolkata, India. The names of 8 sanyasis are written in 8 pieces of engraved marbles in the memorial.

See also 
 Ishangopalpur massacre
 Char Bhadrasan massacre
 Hasamdia massacre
 Prabhu Jagadbandu

References 

1971 Bangladesh genocide
Massacres of Bengali Hindus in East Pakistan
Persecution of Hindus
Persecution by Muslims
1971 in Bangladesh
1971 in Pakistan
Massacres in 1971
Massacres committed by Pakistan in East Pakistan
April 1971 events in Bangladesh